Todd Martin was the defending champion and successfully defended his title, by defeating Paul Haarhuis 7–6(7–2), 6–4 in the final.

Seeds
All seeds received a bye into the second round.

Draw

Finals

Top half

Section 1

Section 2

Bottom half

Section 3

Section 4

References

External links
 Official results archive (ATP)
 Official results archive (ITF)

1995 Singles
1995 ATP Tour